The NPO Saturn AL-55 is a high performance turbofan engine manufactured by NPO Saturn Russia, for powering advanced trainers, unmanned aerial vehicles (UAV) and light attack aircraft. A variant of the AL-55I powers the HAL HJT-36 Sitara Indian jet trainer.

Design 
The design comprises five main features. It has a three-stage low pressure compressor, five stage high pressure chamber, an annular combustion chamber and a single stage high and low pressure turbines.

In August 2005, the Russian export organization known as Rosoboronexport and India's Hindustan Aeronautics Limited (HAL) signed an agreement for the licensed production of up to 1,000 AL-55I engines. The agreement includes a firm order for 250 engines to be manufactured at HAL facilities in India, to power both HAL HJT-36 trainer and HAL HJT 39 combat trainer aircraft.

Variants
AL-55
AL-55/I: A variant designed for licensed production in India.

Applications 

 HAL HJT-36 Sitara
 HAL HJT 39
 Mikoyan MiG-AT
 KB SAT SR-10

Specifications

See also 

 List of aircraft engines

References 

2010s turbofan engines
AL-55
India–Russia relations